Chrisavgi (Kristi) Stassinopoulou (Athens, 20 January 1956) is a Greek singer, lyricist, and fiction writer. A native Athenian, she is an internationally known artist of the world music circuit. She is accompanied by composer, arranger, co-producer and multi-instrumentalist Stathis Kalyviotis. Their music combines traditional Greek rhythms and sounds, Byzantine vocal lines, rebetiko music, psychedelic rock, ambience and electronica. 

Her work has been compared to that of Hedningarna, Grace Slick and Björk.

Studies and early years
Kristi Stassinopoulou  has studied acting and drama at the school of Theatro Tehnis, Karolos Koun and at the theatre-school of Petros Katselis. 

In 1978, while still a student, she participated in an audition for the Greek production of the rock opera Jesus Christ Superstar by Tim Rice and Andrew Lloyd Webber and was selected from 300 professionals and amateur singers for the role of Mary Magdalene; that was her debut as a professional singer.

In 1983 Stassinopoulou represented Greece in the Eurovision Song Contest in Munich, where she interpreted the song of Antonis Plessas, Mou Les.

At that year she was picked for the role of Juan Perón's young mistress in Tim Rice's and Andrew Lloyd Webber's rock opera Evita, produced in Athens by Aliki Vougiouklaki, who was playing the main role of Evita Peron.

Collaboration with artists of the Greek music scene

Stassinopoulou has also collaborated with several composers, songwriters and singers.

In the 1980s and until the early 1990s, Stassinopoulou performed and toured together with songwriters/singers/composers: Lakis Papadopoulos (Lakis-me-ta-psila-Rever), Demos Moutsis, Nikos Portokaloglou-Fatme, George Pilali. She also collaborated with Pavlos Sidiropoulos, a most legendary figure of the Greek underground rock scene.

Her first record Kristi Stassinopoulou was released in 1986 by Adelfi Falirea. Composer/singer Stavros Papastavrou co-wrote the songs of this record together with Kleon Antoniou (of the ethno-jazz band Mode Plagal) and Takis Barberis.

For her second LP record, Sti Limni me tis Paparounes (By the lake with the Poppies), she collaborated with songwriters/composers Panagiotis Kalantzopoulos and Evanthia Reboutsika and lyricist Afroditi Rayla. The record was released by Lyra in 1993.

Collaboration with Stathis Kalyviotis

In 1989, Stassinopoulou met multi-instrumentalist/songwriter Stathis Kalyviotis, member -among others- of the Anipofori (The Unbearables), one of the first Greek punk bands in the early 80s, the first to do their songs in Greek lyrics and not in English, as was the habit in the Greek indie-underground-rock scene of the times.

Together with Stathis Kalyviotis, drummer Vangelis Vekios and guitarist Kostis Anagnostopoulos they formed, Selana (sometimes cited as Selena), a band with an ethnopunk sound that never made an album, but became cult, often performing also as the support group of late Pavlos Sidiropoulos.

In 1997, Stassinopoulou and Kalyviotis produced their first album Ifantokosmos which was released by the independent label Thesis. Their next album, Echotropia, was released in 1999. It was distributed in Greece, N. America and Brasil and was the first Greek album to reach the Top 10 position in the World Music Charts Europe.

In July 2000, Stassinopoulou, Kalyviotis and their band were the first Greeks to perform at the International Jazz Festival in Montreal , on its 21st edition. Their first North American appearance took place in July 2002 and it was organized by Dan Berhman. There they played a.o. at the Winnipeg Folk Festival in Canada, the Millennium Stage of the Kennedy Centre in Washington DC, the Central Park Summer StageFestival in New York.

In May 2001, she participated in the Greece in Britain series of concerts at the Barbican Theatre of London; the late Charlie Gillett, who was in the audience, hosted Stassinopoulou and Kalyviotis live in his Saturday BBC Radio 3 show, The Sound of the World.

In 2002, The Secrets of the Rocks was released in Greece by Hitch Hyke Records. In October 2002 Stassinopoulou, Kalyviotis and their band played at Womex in Essen, Germany.
In January 2003 The Secrets of the Rocks reached number 1 on the World Music Charts Europe, went number 2 in February and remained for 6 months in total in the top-10 list.  The album was also released in N. America, Spain the U.K.

In March 2003, Stassinopoulou was the cover story of the world music UK magazine, fRoots, interviewed by Ian Anderson. In October 2003 she played in Union Chappell, London, in the Europe in Union series of concerts organized by fRoots. In August and September 2004, Stassinopoulou and Kalyviotis toured for one-month tour in 17 cities in Brazil, Mostra de Artes Mediterraneo, Roteiro Verde 2005.

In 2007, Taxidoscopio was released in Spain, Germany, Japan and Greece and was included in the top-15 of WOMEX World Music CDs of the year. Together with their band, or as a duo, Stassinopoulou and Kalyviotis have appeared on several music festivals and clubs in Europe, N. America and Brazil.

In 2012, Greekadelia was released worldwide by World Music Network/Riverboat. The album was launched at the Green Note, Camden, London on 24 June. In the World Music Charts Europe of August 2012 the album was number one charts hit.

Other activities
Stassinopoulou has published two books:

Her first book Epta Fores stin Amorgo (Seven Times in Amorgos)  containing seven mystery short stories set on the Cycladic island of Amorgos, was published in 1993 by Kastaniotis Editions.

Her second book Pyrini Romfaia (Fiery Sward)    is a novel of magic set in Athens in the early 1990s and was published in 1995 by Livanis Editions.

She has also been writing and publishing short-stories and articles mainly on music, in magazines and fanzines. Stassinopoulou has also worked as a radio producer, presenting her own radio shows in the Athenian-based radios: Sky 100,4 (1989–1992), Kanali 15 (1992-3), En Lefko (1998-9). .

Stassinopoulou also supplied voices of Ariel in the 1991 Greek dub of The Little Mermaid, Belle in the Greek dub of Beauty and the Beast, Shanti in the Greek dub of The Jungle Book, Bambi's mother in the Greek dub of Bambi, and she voiced a supporting character in the Greek dub of The Rescuers Down Under.

Discography

Notes

External links
  Website
 MySpace site
 

1956 births
Living people
20th-century Greek actresses
21st-century Greek women singers
20th-century Greek novelists
20th-century Greek women writers
20th-century short story writers
Actresses from Athens
Eurovision Song Contest entrants of 1983
Eurovision Song Contest entrants for Greece
20th-century Greek women singers
Greek mystery writers
Greek novelists
Greek voice actresses
Greek women novelists
Greek women short story writers
Greek short story writers
Singers from Athens
Wrasse Records artists